Gondwanamyces is a genus of fungi in the family Ceratocystidaceae. The genus was circumscribed in 1998.

References

External links

Sordariomycetes genera
Microascales